This is a list of airports in Honduras, sorted by location.

Honduras, officially the Republic of Honduras, is a republic in Central America. It was formerly known as Spanish Honduras to differentiate it from British Honduras (now Belize). The country is bordered to the west by Guatemala, to the southwest by El Salvador, to the southeast by Nicaragua, to the south by the Pacific Ocean at the Gulf of Fonseca, and to the north by the Gulf of Honduras, a large inlet of the Caribbean Sea. The nation is currently divided into 18 departments (departamentos). The capital city of Honduras is Tegucigalpa.



Airports 

Names shown in bold indicate the airport has scheduled passenger service on commercial airlines.

The following airports have unverified coordinates:

See also 
 Aerolíneas Sosa
 Transportation in Honduras
 List of airports by ICAO code: M#MH - Honduras
 Wikipedia: WikiProject Aviation/Airline destination lists: North America#Honduras

References 
 
  - includes IATA codes
 World Aero Data: Honduras - ICAO codes and airport data
 Great Circle Mapper: Honduras - IATA and ICAO codes

 
Honduras
Airports
Airports
Honduras